The Saga Continues... is the third and final studio album by R&B group Suns of Light (as the Boys), released on June 27, 1992, via Motown Records.

The album reached No. 191 on the Billboard 200 and No. 45 on the Billboard R&B Albums chart. The title track peaked at number 15 on the Billboard Hot R&B Singles chart.

Track listing

Personnel

Lead vocals – The Boys
Bass – Roy "Dog" Pennon (tracks: 6, 11, 12),
Guitar – Stan Jones (tracks: 1, 2, 3, 4, 6, 7, 10, 11, 12)
Keyboards – Hakeem Abdulsamad, Roy "Dog" Pennon (tracks: 9)
Drum programming – Hakeem Abdulsamad*, Roy "Dog" Pennon* (tracks: 9)
Scratches – Tray-Ski

Producer – Hakeem Abdulsamad
Co-producers – Bilal Abdulsamad, Khiry Abdulsamad, Roy "Dog" Pennon* (tracks: 9), Tajh Abdulsamad
Engineer – John Karpowich
Executive producers – Jabari Abdulsamad, Vida Sparks
Mastered by Herb Powers
Mixed by Dave Way (tracks: 2, 3, 4, 7, 9, 10), Hakeem Abdulsamad*, John Karpowich (tracks: 1, 5, 6, 11, 12)

1992 albums
The Boys (American band) albums
Motown albums